The 1983–84 Purdue Boilermakers men's basketball team represented Purdue University as a member of the Big Ten Conference during the 1983–84 college basketball season. The Boilermakers were led by fourth-year head coach Gene Keady and played their home games at Mackey Arena in West Lafayette, Indiana. Purdue won the Big Ten title to receive an automatic bid to the NCAA tournament as No. 3 seed in the Midwest region. The Boilermakers – playing a true road game despite being the higher seed – were upset by Memphis State in the round of 32. The team finished with an overall record of 22–7 (15–3 Big Ten).

Roster

Schedule and results

|-
!colspan=9 style=|Non-Conference Regular Season

|-
!colspan=9 style=|Big Ten Regular Season

|-
!colspan=9 style=|NCAA Tournament

Rankings

Awards and honors
Gene Keady – Big Ten Coach of the Year

References

Purdue Boilermakers men's basketball seasons
Purdue
Purdue
Purdue Boilermakers men's basketball
Purdue Boilermakers men's basketball